White is a city in Bartow County, Georgia, United States. The population was 661 at the 2020 census.

History
A post office called White has been in operation since 1890. James Alexander White, the first postmaster, gave the city its name.

The Georgia General Assembly incorporated White as a town in 1919.

In March 2016, the city's police chief, as well as its only full-time officer, were arrested on false imprisonment charges. The arrests left the city with no police department.

The city has a new mayor as of June 6, 2022, Perry Bell, who later passed away on September 25, 2022.

Geography
White is located at  (34.280449, -84.746606).

Demographics

As of the census of 2000, there were 693 people, 258 households, and 197 families residing in the city. The racial makeup of the city was 94.81% White, 2.89% African American, 0.29% Native American, 0.14% Asian, 0.87% from other races, and 1.01% from two or more races. Hispanic or Latino of any race were 2.60% of the population.

There were 258 households, out of which 41.1% had children under the age of 18 living with them, 56.6% were married couples living together, 14.3% had a female householder with no husband present, and 23.6% were non-families. 20.9% of all households were made up of individuals, and 9.3% had someone living alone who was 65 years of age or older.  The average household size was 2.69 and the average family size was 3.04.

In the city, the population was spread out, with 31.0% under the age of 18, 8.9% from 18 to 24, 28.7% from 25 to 44, 19.2% from 45 to 64, and 12.1% who were 65 years of age or older.  The median age was 32 years. For every 100 females, there were 98.0 males.  For every 100 females age 18 and over, there were 88.2 males.

The median income for a household in the city was $31,458, and the median income for a family was $36,250. Males had a median income of $30,500 versus $22,404 for females. The per capita income for the city was $14,665.  About 13.8% of families and 15.5% of the population were below the poverty line, including 11.3% of those under age 18 and 17.4% of those age 65 or over.

Points of Interest

 Old Car City USA is an old car junkyard on US 411/SR 61 with more than 4,000 old cars (1972 and older) in 34 acres, open to public with paid admissions. It attracts photographers from out of state & several countries. website

References

External links
City of White official website

Cities in Georgia (U.S. state)
Cities in Bartow County, Georgia